The Royal Thai Marine Corps or RTMC ( are the marines of the Royal Thai Navy. The Royal Thai Marine Corps was founded in 1932, when the first battalion was formed with the assistance of the United States Marine Corps. It was expanded to a regiment in 1940 and was in action against communist guerrillas throughout the 1950s and 1960s. During the 1960s the United States Marine Corps assisted in its expansion into a brigade. The Royal Thai Marine Corps saw action on the Malaysian border in the 1970s, and has now been increased to four brigades.

History
Historically, there was no distinction in Siam between soldiers and marines, with the army performing both functions. The first "Thahan Ma-Rine", meaning "Marine Soldiers", were formed in 1833, during the reign of King Rama III. "Ma-Rine" was simply a transliteration of the English word. The development of the modern Thai Marine Corps can be divided into three periods:

Early years

The Marine Soldiers of the 19th and early 20th centuries were few in number and served mainly as a royal honor guard that provided security for the King whenever he traveled around the country.

On March 2, 1913, however, the Ministry of the Navy reorganized the Marine Soldiers. The Marine artillery platoon was attached to the Operation Command Department of Ships and Fortresses, while the Marine infantry platoon in Bangkok was attached to the Vehicle Division of the Department of the Navy Amphibious Assault Group.

The Revolution in 1932 transformed Thailand from an absolute monarchy to a constitutional monarchy. Shortly after, the Royal Thai Navy was reorganized, and the vehicle battalion became the Marine Corps Battalion of the Bangkok Navy Station. This is considered the first Marine Corps Battalion in Thailand.

Post–1932 Revolution (1932–1955)

The 2nd Marine Corps Battalion was established at Sattahip in 1937. Two years later, the 2nd Battalion was expanded into the Marine Corps Department. Shortly after that, a border dispute with French Indo-China turned violent, and the Marine Corps Department's "Chanthaburi Division" was engaged in action with the French Foreign Legion several times. During World War II, the Marine Corps sent troops to defend the southern border with Malaya and also guarded Phuket Province from possible attack.

After Imperial Japan's surrender in September 1945, Thai Marines helped disarm the Japanese Army at Baan Pong District in Ratchaburi Province. In 1950, when violence in Malaysia spilled over into Thailand, Marine Corps Troop 6 was sent to help restore the peace in Narathiwat Province.

On June 29, 1951, the Thai government disbanded the Marine Corps Bureau, and Marine units were placed under the command the Army. This was in response to the Manhattan Rebellion in which part of the Navy (including Marines) rebelled against the ruling Army junta. However, this was during the Korean War, and both the United States Military and the Royal Thai Navy urged Thailand to reconsider.

New Age (1955–present)

Four years later, the Thai Government acknowledged that a Marine Corps could perform a useful role in national defense. On July 30, 1955, the government created the Marine Corps Department. In 1961, tensions flared over the disputed Preah Vihear Temple, situated on the Thai side of a high cliff on the Cambodian border but shown on French maps as being in Cambodia. The Chanthaburi and Trat borders with Cambodia gave the Marine Corps Department its first assignment, safeguarding the coastline and southeastern border. Since 1970 the Marine Corps' Chanthaburi-Trat Task Force has been officially assigned the defense of this area.

During 1972 and 1973, Thai Marines were involved in the "Operation Sam-Chai" anti-communist operations in Phetchabun Province and the "Pha-Phum" anti-communist operations in Chiang Rai Province. In 1973 and 1974, they took part in anti-communist operations in the southern provinces of Pattani, Yala, and Narathiwat.

Since 1975, Thai Marines have been assigned to Narathiwat as Force Reconnaissance Battalion. In 1977, they captured the communist camp at Krung-Ching in Nakhon Si Thammarat Province, and remaining there until 1981.

Thai Marines today are responsible for border security in Chanthaburi and Trat provinces. They have fought communist insurgents in engagements at Baan Hard Lek, Baan Koat Sai, Baan Nhong Kok, Baan Kradook Chang, Baan Chumrark, and in the battle of Hard Don Nai in Nakhon Phanom Province.

Many Thai Marines have lost their lives serving their country, and they continue to do so today, especially in the southern border provinces currently affected by the South Thailand insurgency. A monument to their valor stands at the Royal Thai Navy base at Sattahip.

United Nations Peacekeeping Operations
  United Nations Iraq–Kuwait Observation Mission
 1st Combat Engineer Company in Iraq 
  United Nations Operation in Burundi
 1st Combat Engineer Company in Burundi 
  United Nations–African Union Mission in Darfur
  United Nations Mission in Sudan
 1st Force Reconnaissance Company in Sudan
 1st Armored Company in Sudan

Organization

Royal Thai Marine Corps Headquarters

 Royal Thai Marine Corps Education Command
 Marine Corps School
 Recruit Training Division
 Support Division
 RTMC: Marine Division 
 RTMC: 1st Marine Regiment 
 RTMC: 1st Infantry Battalion King's Guard 
 RTMC: 2nd Infantry Battalion 
 RTMC: 3rd Infantry Battalion
 RTMC: 2nd Marine Regiment
 RTMC: 4th Infantry Battalion 
 RTMC: 5th Infantry Battalion 
 RTMC: 6th Infantry Battalion 
 RTMC: 3rd Marine Regiment
 RTMC: 7th Infantry Battalion
 RTMC: 8th Infantry Battalion 
 RTMC: 9th Infantry Battalion King's Guard 
 RTMC: Marine Artillery Regiment
 RTMC: 1st Artillery Battalion
 RTMC: 2nd Artillery Battalion
 RTMC: Air Defense Artillery Battalion
 RTMC: 4th Artillery Battalion
 RTMC: Marine Service Support Regiment
 RTMC: Medical Battalion
 RTMC: Dental Battalion
 RTMC: Maintenance Battalion
 RTMC: Transport Battalion
 RTMC: Marine Assault Amphibious Vehicle Support Company
 RTMC: Marine Band Platoon
RTMC Reconnaissance Battalion also known as (Force Recon Marine/Marine Special Force)
 RTMC: Marine Assault Amphibian Vehicle Battalion: equipped with AAV-7A1 and BTR-3E1
 RTMC: Marine Tank Battalion: equipped with Type 69-ll MBT
 RTMC: Anti-Tank Company
 RTMC: Marine Combat Engineer Battalion: 
 RTMC: Marine Signals Battalion
 RTMC: Marine Military Police Company
 RTMC: Marine Security Regiment
 RTMC: Marine Psychological Company
 RTMC: Marine Task Forces
 RTMC: Marine 61st Special Operations Center
 RTMC: Marines Task Unit 411
 RTMC: Paramilitary Marine Regiment

Miscellaneous 
 The Royal Thai Marine Corps uses the Subskimmer

Equipment

Small arms

Rocket, grenade and MANPAD

Combat vehicles

Logistic vehicles

Field artillery

Historical equipment

Armoured fighting vehicles

Field artillery

Combat Engagements
 World War II
 Franco–Thai War
 Pacific War
 Malayan Campaign
Cold War
 Korean War
 Vietnam War
 Communist insurgency in Thailand
 Communist insurgency in Malaysia
 Third Indochina War
 Cambodian–Vietnamese War
 Vietnamese border raids in Thailand
 Thai–Laotian Border War
Persian Gulf War
1999 East Timorese crisis
 International Force East Timor
Global War on Terrorism
Southern Insurgency
 Battle of Bacho (2013)
United Nations peacekeeping
 United Nations Iraq–Kuwait Observation Mission
 United Nations Operation in Burundi
 United Nations–African Union Mission in Darfur
 United Nations Mission in Sudan

In popular culture
 Mercury Man is a 2006 Thai superhero martial arts action film. It is directed by Bhandit Thongdee with martial arts choreography by Panna Rittikrai of Ong-Bak, Tom-Yum-Goong and Born to Fight. Thai marines is control Afghan terrorist group in movies.

Rank structure

Personnel of the RTMC use the uniform, ranks and insignia used by the personnel of the Royal Thai Navy, but with exceptions, such as:
 Personnel of the RTMC wear combat helmets as part of their ceremonial uniforms instead of sailor caps or peaked caps (except officers who wear peaked caps)
 Usually, Marines wear naval style insignia on the chest marks in their combat uniforms
 Marines wear in semi-formal situations the Navy's khaki dress uniform

See also
 Royal Thai Navy
 Air and Coastal Defence Command 
 RTMC Reconnaissance Battalion
 Royal Thai Naval Air Division

Notes

External links

 
 English information on the Royal Thai Marine Corps

1932 establishments in Siam
Infantry divisions of Thailand
Thai
Military of Thailand
Military units and formations established in 1932
Royal Thai Navy